Warball is the ninth album by heavy metal band Vicious Rumors, released in 2006.

Track listing
"Sonic Rebellion" - 2:55
"Mr. Miracle" - 4:52
"Dying Every Day" - 4:44
"Immortal" - 3:56
"Warball" - 6:22
"Crossthreaded" - 4:46
"Wheels of Madness" - 3:46
"Windows of Memory" - 3:03
"Ghost Within" - 4:56
"Oceans of Rage" - 3:39

Personnel
 Geoff Thorpe: Guitars
 Brad Gillis: Guitars (Lead on 1-4 & 9)
 Thaen Rasmussen: Guitars (Lead on 2, 7 & 8)
 James Rivera: Vocals
 Dave Starr: Bass
 Larry Howe: Drums

References

2006 albums
Vicious Rumors albums